The Vermont Catamounts Men's Basketball team is the men's basketball team that represents the University of Vermont in Burlington, Vermont. The school's team currently competes in the America East Conference and plays its home games at Patrick Gym. The team has reached the NCAA Division I men's basketball tournament nine times, in 2003, 2004, 2005, 2010, 2012, 2017, 2019, 2022, and 2023. UVM famously upset Syracuse University in the first round of the 2005 tournament. The Catamounts are coached by John Becker.

History

Retired numbers

Five Catamount players have had their numbers retired by the University of Vermont:

Notes

Awards
 
America East Coach of the Year
Tom Brennan – 1991, 1998, 2002
Mike Lonergan – 2007, 2011
John Becker – 2014, 2017, 2018, 2019, 2020, 2022

America East Player of the Year
Matt Johnson – 1991
Kevin Roberson – 1992
T.J. Sorrentine – 2002
Taylor Coppenrath – 2003, 2004, 2005
Marqus Blakely – 2008, 2009
Trae Bell-Haynes – 2017, 2018
Anthony Lamb – 2019, 2020
 Ryan Davis – 2021, 2022
 Finn Sullivan - 2023

America East Defensive Player of the Year
Marqus Blakely – 2008, 2009, 2010
Brendan Bald – 2011
Brian Voelkel – 2014
 Dre Wills – 2017
 Ben Shungu – 2020

America East Rookie of the Year
Eddie Benton – 1993
Tony Orciari – 1998
T.J. Sorrentine – 2001
Taylor Coppenrath – 2002
Mike Trimboli – 2006
Brian Voelkel – 2011
Four McGlynn – 2012
Anthony Lamb – 2017 

America East Sixth Man of the Year
Cam Ward – 2015, 2018
Darren Payen – 2017
 Ryan Davis – 2020
Aaron Deloney – 2022, 2023

All-Conference First Team
Ed Kotlarczyk – 1949
Keith Galli – 1950
Clyde Lord – 1957, 1958, 1959
Benny Becton – 1961
Ralph D'Altilia – 1965
Frank Martiniuk – 1970
Ron Gottschalk – 1975
Mike Evelti – 1981, 1982
Kevin Roberson – 1991, 1992
Matt Johnson – 1991
Eddie Benton – 1993, 1994, 1995, 1996
Erik Nelson – 1998
Tony Oriciari – 2000, 2001
Trevor Gaines – 2002
T.J. Sorrentine – 2002, 2004, 2005
Taylor Coppenrath – 2003, 2004, 2005
Chris Holm – 2007
Mike Trimboli – 2007, 2009
Marqus Blakely – 2008, 2009, 2010
Evan Fjeld – 2011
Matt Glass – 2012
Brian Voelkel – 2013, 2014
Sandro Carissimo – 2014
Clancy Rugg – 2014
Ethan O'Day – 2015
Trae Bell-Haynes – 2017, 2018
Anthony Lamb – 2019, 2020
Ernie Duncan – 2019
Stef Smith – 2020
 Ryan Davis – 2021, 2022
Ben Shungu – 2022 
Finn Sullivan – 2023 
Robin Duncan – 2023

All-Conference Second Team
Ken Pierce – 1949
Keith Galli – 1950
Nat Campana – 1953, 1954
Earl Steinman – 1955
Bob Kuchar – 1958, 1959
Charlie Isles – 1960
Richie Ader – 1962
Layne Higgs – 1966
Dave Lapointe – 1968
Frank Martiniuk – 1969
Joe Calavita – 1987
Kevin Roberson – 1990
Tony Oriciari – 1998
Taylor Coppenrath – 2002
Mike Trimboli – 2006, 2008
Clancy Rugg – 2013
Dre Wills – 2015
Anthony Lamb – 2017
Ernie Duncan – 2018
Drew Uruqhart – 2018
Stef Smith – 2021
Ben Shungu – 2021 
Dylan Penn – 2023

All-Conference Third Team
Erik Nelson – 1997
Tony Oriciari – 1999
Tobe Carberry – 2000
Grant Anderson – 2003
Martin Klimes – 2006, 2007
Colin McIntosh – 2009
Maurice Joseph – 2010
Evan Fjeld – 2010
Brendan Bald – 2011
Brian Voelkel – 2012
Sandro Carissimo – 2013
Ethan O'Day – 2016
 Kurt Steidl – 2016
Trae Bell-Haynes – 2016
Ernie Duncan – 2017
Payton Henson – 2017, 2018
Isaiah Powell – 2022

All-Conference Defensive Team
Marqus Blakely – 2008, 2009, 2010
Garvey Young – 2010
Brendan Bald – 2011
Brian Voelkel – 2012, 2013, 2014
Ethan O'Day – 2014, 2015
Dre Wills – 2015, 2016, 2017
Ernie Duncan – 2018
Anthony Lamb – 2019
Samuel Dingba – 2019
Ben Shungu – 2020, 2021, 2022 
Robin Duncan – 2023

All-Conference Rookie Team
Rahim Huland El – 1988
Kenny White – 1989
Brian Tarrant – 1990
Eddie Benton – 1993
Erik Nelson – 1995
David Roach – 1997
Tony Orciari – 1998
Trevor Gaines – 1999
T.J. Sorrentine – 2000
Taylor Coppenrath – 2001
Josh Duell – 2005
Mike Trimboli – 2006
Joe Trapani – 2007
Garvey Young – 2009
Brian Voelkel – 2011
Four McGlynn – 2012
Kurt Steidel – 2014
Trae Bell-Haynes – 2015
Ernie Duncan – 2016
Anthony Lamb – 2017
Stef Smith – 2018
Robin Duncan – 2019 
 T.J Hurley  – 2023

All-American
Anthony Lamb – (2019 Honorable Mention – AP)
Trae Bell-Haynes – (2017, 2018 Honorable Mention – AP)
Marqus Blakely – (2008, 2009 Honorable Mention – AP)
Taylor Coppenrath – (2003, 2004, 2005 Honorable Mention – AP)
T.J. Sorrentine – (2002 Honorable Mention – AP)
Mike Evelti – (1981 Honorable Mention – AP)
Ron Gottschalk - (1975 Honorable Mention - AP)

Hall of Fame

Postseason

NCAA tournament results
The Catamounts have appeared in the NCAA Division I tournament nine times. Their combined record is 2–9.

NIT results
The Catamounts have appeared in the National Invitation Tournament (NIT) four times. Their combined record is 0–4.

CBI results
The Catamounts have appeared in the College Basketball Invitational (CBI) four times. Their combined record is 5–4.

Coaches

Season-by-season results

Records

All-time leaders

Points

Assists

Rebounds

Results against nationally ranked opponents
Vermont has played a ranked opponent 35 times, going 2–33.

 % NCAA Tournament game
 $ in Glens Falls, New York

Media 
The Catamounts receive regular television, newspaper and radio coverage throughout the year. All home conference games are broadcast on ESPN3, while radio broadcasts can be heard on WCPV (101.3 ESPN). Three television stations – WCAX-TV, WFFF-TV, and WPTZ – provide local coverage, while The Burlington Free Press provides extensive reporting of Vermont basketball, as well.

References